The Budapest Beacon was an online newspaper that reported on current events in Hungary. It was published by United States-based Real Reporting Foundation, a news organization.

Online presence 

In July 2014, Hungarian news portals reported that The Budapest Beacon planned to launch a Hungarian-language news website that September.

The newspaper was often critical of the Fidesz government.

A number of Hungarian and international media outlets have reported on Hungarian events using content attributed to The Budapest Beacon, including The Jerusalem Post, the GlobalPost, Catholic World News, Xplatloop.com, and Politics.hu, The Budapest Times, Mandiner.hu, Der Standard, and Gawker, Foreign Policy, The Washington Post, and Haaretz.

Defunction 
The online newspaper ceased publication on 13 April 2018.

See also
List of newspapers in Hungary
Fourth Estate

References 

Hungarian news websites
Web portals
Mass media in Hungary
American news websites